This article is a list of winners of Prêmio Angelo Agostini, sorted by category.

Current categories

Master of National Comics

Penciller 
1986: Watson Portela
1987: Mozart Couto
1988: Spacca
1989: Laerte
1990: Gustavo Machado
1991: Hector Gomez
1992: Gustavo Machado / Lourenço Mutarelli
1993: Marcelo Campos
1994: Marcelo Campos
1995: Fernando Gonsales
1996: Arthur Garcia
1997: Sebastião Seabra
1998: Marcelo Campos
1999: Laerte
2000: Marcelo Campos
2001: Flavio Colin
2002: Flavio Colin
2003: Julio Shimamoto
2004: Mozart Couto
2005: Wanderley Felipe
2006: Fábio Moon and Gabriel Bá
2007: Fábio Moon and Gabriel Bá
2008: Laudo Ferreira Jr.
2009: Laudo Ferreira Jr.
2010: Adauto Silva
2011: Hélcio Rogério
2012: Maurílio DNA
2013: Danilo Beyruth
2014: Shiko
2015: Mario Cau
2016: Di Amorim
2017: Mary Cagnin
2018: Mario Cau
2019: Mauro Fodra
2020: Shiko
2021: Laura Athayde
2022: Bianca Mól

Writer 
1986: Júlio Emílio Braz
1987: Gilberto Camargo
1988: Fernando Gonsales
1989: Luiz Aguiar
1990: Novaes
1991: Laerte
1992: Laerte
1993: Laerte
1994: Marcelo Campos
1995: Arthur Garcia
1996: Lúcia Nóbrega
1997: Laerte
1998: Marcelo Cassaro
1999: Marcelo Cassaro
2000: Gian Danton
2001: André Diniz
2002: Wellington Srbek
2003: Wellington Srbek
2004: Marcelo Cassaro
2005: Fábio Moon and Gabriel Bá
2006: Marcatti
2007: Anita Costa Prado
2008: Anita Costa Prado
2009: Daniel Esteves
2010: Laudo Ferreira Jr.
2011: Marcos Franco
2012: Daniel Esteves
2013: Petra Leão
2014: Gustavo Duarte
2015: Felipe Cagno
2016: Alex Mir
2017: Alex Mir
2018: Marcelo Marchi
2019: Rafael Calça
2020: Fefê Torquato
2021: Mary Cagnin
2022: Leandro Assis and Triscila Oliveira

Release 
1986: Chiclete com Banana, by Angeli (Circo) / Revista Medo, by many authors (Press)
1987: Bundha, by many authors (Press)
1988: Radar, by many authors (Press)
1989: Seleções do Quadrix: Garra Cinzenta, by Francisco Armond and Renato Silva (Waz)
1990: Menino Maluquinho, by many authors (Abril)
1991: Piratas do Tietê, by Laerte (Circo)
1992: Graphic Trapa, by many authors (Abril)
1993: Pau-Brasil, by many authors (Vidente)
1994: SemiDeuses, by Alessandro A. Librandi and Walter Jr. (Saga)
1995: Mulher-Diaba no Rastro de Lampião, by Ataíde Braz and Flavio Colin (Nova Sampa)
1996: Coleção Assombração, by many authors (Ediouro)
1997: Gibizão da Turma da Mônica, by many authors (Globo)
1998: Metal Pesado, by many authors (Metal Pesado)
1999: Cybercomix, by many authors (Bookmakers)
2000: O Dobro de Cinco, by Lourenço Mutarelli (Devir)
2001: Fawcett, by André Diniz and Flavio Colin (Nona Arte)
2002: Fábrica de Quadrinhos 2001, by many authors (Devir)
2003: Madame Satã, by Luiz Antonio Aguiar e Júlio Shimamoto (Opera Graphica)
2004: Roko-Loko e Adrina-Lina, by Marcio Baraldi (Opera Graphica)
2005: Roko-Loko e Adrina-Lina Atacam Novamente, by Marcio Baraldi (Opera Graphica)
2006: Tattoo Zinho, by Marcio Baraldi (Opera Graphica)
2007: Katita - Tiras Sem Preconceito, by Anita Costa Prado and Ronaldo Mendes (Marca de Fantasia)
2008: Menino Caranguejo, by Chicolam (Splinter Comics)
2009: Menina Infinito, by Fábio Lyra (Desiderata)
2010: Roko-Loko - Hey Ho, Let's Go!, by Marcio Brandi (Rock Brigade)
2011: Bando de dois, by Danilo Beyruth (Zarabatana)
2012: Ação Magazine, by many authors (Lancaster)
2013: Astronauta - Magnetar, by Danilo Beyruth (Panini)
2014: Meninos e Dragões, by Lucio Luiz and Flavio Soares (Abril)
2015: Yeshuah - Onde tudo está, by Laudo Ferreira Jr. (Devir)
2016: Valkíria - A fonte da juventude, by Alex Mir and Alex Genaro (Draco)
2017: Spectrus - Paralisia do Sono, by Thiago Spyked (Crás)
2018: Labirinto, by Thiago Souto (Mino)
2019: Gibi de Menininha, by Germana Viana, Renata C B Lzz, Roberta Cirne, Camila Suzuki, Mari Santtos, Clarice França, Katia Schittine, Fabiana Signorini, Milena Azevedo, Carol Pimentel, Ana Recalde, Talessa K and Camila Torrano (Zarabatana)
2020: Contos dos Orixás, by Hugo Canuto (Ébórá Comics Group)
2021: Apagão: Fruto Proibido, by Raphael Fernandes, Abel and Fabi Marques (Draco)
2022: 	Confinada, by Leandro Assis and Triscila Oliveira (Todavia)

Jayme Cortez Trophy 
1988: Marcatti
1989: Jal and Gualberto
1990: Franco de Rosa
1991: Franco de Rosa
1992: Worney Almeida de Souza
1993: Gibiteca Henfil
1994: Edgard Guimarães
1995: Edgard Guimarães
1996: Edgard Guimarães
1997: Edgard Guimarães
1998: Editora Metal Pesado
1999: Editora Bookmakers
2000: Edgard Guimarães
2001: Edgard Guimarães
2002: Editora Opera Graphica
2003: Editora Opera Graphica
2004: André Diniz / Sidney Gusman / Editora Opera Graphica
2005: Roberto Guedes
2006: Bigorna.net
2007: Edgard Guimarães
2008: Eloyr Pacheco
2009: Coletivo Quarto Mundo
2010: José Salles
2011: José Salles
2012: Festival Internacional de Quadrinhos
2013: Gibicon
2014: Sidney Gusman
2015: Confraria do Gibi
2016: Gibiteca de Santos
2017: Ivan Freitas da Costa
2018: Fabio Tatsubô
2019: Quadrinhos (exhibition in São Paulo Museum of Image and Sound)
2020: Butantã Gibicon
2021: Mina de HQ magazine
2022: Alessandro Garcia

Fanzine 
1993: Panacea
1994: Panacea
1995: Marvel News
1996: Informativo de Quadrinhos Independentes
1997: Informativo de Quadrinhos Independentes
1998: Informativo de Quadrinhos Independentes
1999: Mocinhos e Bandidos
2000: Quadrinhos Independentes
2001: Quadrinhos Independentes
2002: Quadrinhos Independentes
2003: Quadrinhos Independentes
2004: Quadrinhos Independentes
2005: Quadrinhos Independentes
2006: Quadrinhos Independentes
2007: Justiça Eterna
2008: Justiça Eterna
2009: Quadrinhos Independentes
2010: QI
2011: QI
2012: Miséria
2013: Quadrante Sul
2014: Quadrinhos Ácidos
2015: 3ADFZPA - Terceiro Anuário de Fanzines, Zines e Publicações alternativas
2016: Peibê
2017: Café Ilustrado
2018: Tchê
2019: Credo, que delícia
2020: Vigilante Rodoviário
2021: Peibê
2022: Tchê

Editorial Cartoonist, Political Cartoonist or Caricaturist 
2003: Cláudio / Spacca / Marcio Baraldi / Lupin / Bira Dantas
2004: Bira Dantas / Marcio Baraldi
2005: Marcio Baraldi
2006: Bira Dantas
2007: Marcio Baraldi
2008: Marcio Baraldi
2009: Marcio Baraldi
2010: Sivanildo Sill
2011: Marcio Baraldi
2012: Gustavo Duarte
2013: Jean Galvão
2014: Angeli
2015: DaCosta
2016: Brum
2017: Carlos Henrique Guabiras
2018: Guilherme Bandeira
2019: Carol Andrade
2020: Laerte
2021: Nando Motta
2022: Renato Aroeira

Independent Release 
2011: Lucas da Vila de Sant'anna da Feira, by Marcos Franco, Marcelo Lima and Hélcio Rogério
2012: Love Hurts, by Murilo Martins
2013: Last RPG Fantasy, by Yoshi Itice, Marcel Keiiche and Kendy Saito
2014: Plataforma HQ, by many authors
2015: Nenhum dia sem um traço, by Ernani Cousandier
2016: Nos bastidores da Bíblia - Êxodo, by Carlos Ruas and Leonardo Maciel
2017: Protocolo: A Ordem, by Thiago da Silva Mota and Ton Marx
2018: Bilhetes, by many authors
2019: Saudade, by Melissa Garabeli and Phellip Willian
2020: Orixás: Ikú, by Alex Mir
2021: Quarentena em Quadrinhos, by Rose Araujo
2022: Não Ligue, Isso É Coisa de Mulher!, by Bianca Mól, Eliane Bonadio, Fabiana Signorini, Flávia Gasi, Ligia Zanella, Luiza Lemos, Mari Santtos, Nanda Alves, Renata C B Lzz and Roberta Cirne

Webcomic 
2015: Blue e os Gatos, by Paulo Kielwagen
2016: Nuvens de Verão, by Charles Lindberg and Israel de Oliveira
2017: Marco e Seus Amigos, by Tako X and Alessandra Freitas
2018: Na Mira da Lena, by Luciano Freitas
2019: Armandinho, by Alexandre Beck
2020: Capirotinho, by Guilherme Infante
2021: Téo & o Mini Mundo, by Caetano Cury
2022: Téo & o Mini Mundo, by Caetano Cury

Colorist 
2019: Cris Peter
2020: May Cagnin
2021: Fabi Marques
2022: Orlandeli

Children's Release 
2020: Como Fazer Amigos e Enfrentar Fantasmas, by Gustavo Borges and Eric Peleias
2021: Jeremias: Alma, by Rafael Calça e Jefferson Costa
2022: Chico Bento: Verdade, by Orlandeli

Extra categories 
In some years, there were extra categories that were not later incorporated into the main award.

Special trophy 
1987: Union of Journalists of São Paulo / Jayme Cortez (for 50 years dedicated to comics)

Art-technique (colorist and letterer) 
2003: Alexandre Silva / Lilian Mitsunaga / André Vazzios / André Hernandez / Alexandre Jubran
2004: Alexandre Jubran / André Vazzios

Inker 
2003: Erica Awano / Emir Ribeiro / Marcelo Borba / Sílvio Spotti / Omar Viñole
2004: Mozart Couto / Renato Guedes

Publisher 
2003: Franco de Rosa / Carlos Mann / Roberto Guedes / André Diniz / Edgard Guimarães
2004: Bira / Marcio Baraldi

School 
2003: Impacto / Quanta / Esa / Graphis / Abra

Classic publishing house 
2003: D-Arte / Ebal / Vecchi / Grafipar / GEP

Current publishing house 
2003: 	Escala / Via Lettera / Devir / O Pasquim / Virgo

Comic store 
2003: Comix Book Shop / Revistas & Cia / Point HQ / Banca Flávio / Itiban Comic Shop

Friend of the national comic 
2003: Cida Cândido / Gonçalo Junior / Gualberto Costa / Sidney Gusman / Giovanni Voltolini

Institution 
2003: Gibiteca de Curitiba / Gibiteca Henfil / Salão de Humor de Piracicaba / Núcleo de Quadrinhos da FAU

Hermes Tadeu Special Award - colorist 
2005: Diogo Saito

References

External links 
 AQC-ESP's blog

 
Brazilian comics
Brazilian awards
Comics award winners
Comics-related lists
Lists of award winners